Georges-René Saveuse de Beaujeu, Comte de Beaujeu (June 4, 1810 – July 29, 1865) was a seigneur and political figure in Canada East.

He was born in Montreal in 1810, the son of seigneur Jacques-Philippe Saveuse de Beaujeu and Catherine Chaussegros de Léry, daughter of Gaspard-Joseph Chaussegros de Léry. He studied at the Collège de Montréal. After his father's death from cholera in 1832, he inherited the fief of Nouvelle-Longueuil and the seigneury of Soulanges. Later that year, he married Adélaïde, the daughter of seigneur Philippe-Joseph Aubert de Gaspé. In 1848, he was appointed to the Legislative Council of the Province of Canada. He was elected to the same council for Rigaud division in 1858 and 1862 after it became an elected body. Saveuse de Beaujeu also served as lieutenant-colonel in the militia and was president of the Société Saint-Jean-Baptiste of Montreal. He helped found the Société Historique de Montréal in 1858.

He died at Coteau-du-Lac in 1865.

His son Georges-Raoul-Léotale-Guichart-Humbert later served in the Canadian House of Commons.

References
 

1810 births
1865 deaths
Members of the Legislative Council of the Province of Canada
Presidents of the Saint-Jean-Baptiste Society of Montreal